Wellington is a Chicago 'L' station on the Chicago Transit Authority (CTA) Brown Line; Purple Line express trains also stop at the station during weekday rush hours. It is an elevated station with four tracks and two side platforms, located at 945 West Wellington Avenue in the Lakeview neighborhood of Chicago, Illinois. Red Line trains pass through the station on the middle tracks, but do not stop. The station closed for renovations from March 30, 2008, until July 30, 2009.

History
Wellington station opened in 1900 as a local station on the original Northwestern Elevated Railroad route from Lake and Wells in downtown to Wilson Station. From the late 1940s Wellington became a station on the Ravenswood route (now the Brown Line). The original station house was demolished in the 1960s following a fire. Purple Line express trains began stopping at the station in 1998 as part of an effort to help alleviate congestion on the Brown Line.

Brown Line Capacity Expansion Project

Wellington was reconstructed and renovated as part of the Brown Line Capacity Expansion Project. The new station has extended platforms capable of berthing eight car trains, and elevators to meet ADA accessibility requirements. The Wellington station closed for renovations on March 30, 2008. The station reopened on July 30, 2009.

Notes and references

Notes

References

External links 

 Train schedule (PDF) at CTA official site
Station (then closed) from Google Maps Street View

CTA Brown Line stations
CTA Purple Line stations
Railway stations in the United States opened in 1900
1900 establishments in Illinois